The 2017 Boucherville municipal election was an election that was held on the 5th of November 2017 to elect Boucherville's mayor and eight councillors as part of the 2017 Quebec municipal elections.

Jean Martel and his party's eight candidates were elected. The voter turnout was 47.7%.

The election results were made available on the website of Québec's Ministry of Municipal Affairs and Housing.

Election Results

Mayor

District 1 (Marie-Victorin) Councillor

 Yan S. Laquerre was elected as a candidate for the Équipe Jean Martel - Option Citoyens Citoyennes

District 2 (Rivière-aux-Pins) Councillor

District 3 (Des Découvreurs) Councillor

District 4 (Harmonie) Councillor

District 5 (La Seigneurie) Councillor

The incumbent in District 5 did not run for re-election.

District 6 (Saint-Louis) Councillor

District 7 (De Normandie) Councillor

District 8 (Du Boisé) Councillor

Boucherville
2017
2017